The Ford Hospital, also called the Fifth Avenue Hotel, is located in downtown Omaha, Nebraska. Built in 1916 by Home Builders Incorporated, the hospital was a privately operated facility built and operated by Dr. Michael J. Ford. Operating until 1922, it was the last small, private hospital in the city. Originally designed by James T. Allan, the building stylistically is a unique blend of elements from the Second Renaissance Revival and the Arts and Crafts movements. The building was sold and remodeled as the Fifth Avenue Hotel in 1929, a name referring to the nickname Douglas Street obtained after the installation of new electric lights in 1927. The building was again converted in 1987, and currently serves as apartments.

Notable cases
The hospital was instrumental in Omaha's treatment of the "Great Influenza Epidemic" of 1919. That same year Mayor Edward Parsons Smith was brought to the hospital on September 28, 1919. He was nearly lynched by a mob during the Omaha Race Riot that day.

See also
 List of hospitals in Omaha, Nebraska

References

External links
 Historic postcard of the hospital.

Hospital buildings completed in 1916
Apartment buildings in Omaha, Nebraska
Defunct hospitals in Omaha, Nebraska
History of Midtown Omaha, Nebraska
Hospital buildings on the National Register of Historic Places in Nebraska
National Register of Historic Places in Omaha, Nebraska
1916 establishments in Nebraska